The 1955 European Figure Skating Championships were held at the City Park Ice Rink in Budapest, Hungary from January 27 to 30. Elite senior-level figure skaters from European ISU member nations competed for the title of European Champion in the disciplines of men's singles, ladies' singles, pair skating, and ice dancing.

Results

Men

Ladies

Pairs

Ice dancing

References

External links
 results

European Figure Skating Championships, 1955
European Figure Skating Championships, 1955
European Figure Skating Championships
International figure skating competitions hosted by Hungary
International sports competitions in Budapest
1950s in Budapest
European Figure Skating Championships